Daimyojin-ike is an earthfill dam located in Ehime Prefecture in Japan. The dam is used for irrigation. The catchment area of the dam is 1.5 km2. The dam impounds about 5  ha of land when full and can store 450 thousand cubic meters of water. The construction of the dam was started on 1955 and completed in 1962.

References

Dams in Ehime Prefecture
1962 establishments in Japan